Chúcaro: Wild Pony of the Pampa (1958) is a book written by Francis Kalnay and illustrated by Julian De Miskey. It won Newbery Honor in 1959. Although a work of fiction, it contains factual information about gauchos on the pampas of South America and their way of life, including details about their work, what they wear and eat, and how they entertain themselves.

Awards
In 1959, the book won the Newbery Honor Book award. It was also the winner of the New York Herald Tribune's Spring Festival Award for books ages 8 to 12.

Plot
The story is about a friendship between a twelve-year-old boy called Pedrito and his pony Chucaro and it transpired in a big estancia in Argentina. The latter was once a wild horse on the pampa before he was captured by Pedrito and his gaucho friend Juan when it wandered to graze on a spot near their home. One day, one of the patrons of Pedrito's family purchased a horse and he demanded a gentle animal for his spoiled and cruel son and it was Chucaro he chose despite Pedrito's determination to keep him.

While the book is about the story of a boy meeting a horse and the adventures that came off of it, it is also a tale that describes the life of the loving people of the Argentine pampas and the place that they live in.

References

External links

 Random House review

1958 American novels
Newbery Honor-winning works
Novels set in Argentina
Novels about horses
Children's novels about animals
American children's novels
1958 children's books